The 1981 South Australian Open was a men's Association of Tennis Professionals tennis tournament held on outdoor grass courts at Memorial Drive in Adelaide, Australia that was part of the 1981 Volvo Grand Prix circuit. It was the 79th edition of the tournament and was held from 5 January until 11 January 1981. Fifth-seeded Mark Edmondson won the singles title.

Finals

Singles

 Mark Edmondson defeated  Brad Drewett 7–5, 6–2
 It was Edmondson's 1st title of the year and the 14th of his career.

Doubles

 Colin Dibley /  John James defeated  Craig Edwards /  Eddie Edwards 6–3, 6–4
 It was Dibley's only title of the year and the 21st of his career. It was James's only title of the year and the 2nd of his career.

References

External links
 ATP tournament profile
 ITF tournament edition details

 

 
South Australian Open
South Australian Open, 1981
South Australian Open
South Australian Open